The Rosedale diet is a low-carbohydrate fad diet based on the ideas of Ron Rosedale about how leptin affects the human body. The diet is marketed with questionable claims about how it can treat a large number of human health conditions.

The Rosedale diet is not based on sound science, and there is no evidence it is safe or effective.

Description 

The Rosedale diet was devised by physician Ron Rosedale.

The diet falls into two parts, both of which have lists of restricted and permitted foods. A number of health supplements are recommended, as are 16 unconventional annual health checks. Generally, the diet severely restricts carbohydrate intake.

Reception 

Harriet Hall has written that the book describing the diet is a "puerile effort" in comparison to Gary Taube's book Good Calories, Bad Calories which at least attempted to have a scientific basis.

The diet has been recommended by Joseph Mercola. Hall writes that "neither Mercola nor Rosedale can be recommended to anyone who is interested in science-based medicine".

See also 
 Atkins diet
 Low-carbohydrate diet

References

Further reading

External links 

Ron Rosedale's web site

American inventions
Brand name diet products
Diets
Fad diets
Low-carbohydrate diets